2623 Zech, provisional designation , is a stony binary asteroid from the inner regions of the asteroid belt, approximately 6.5 kilometers in diameter. It was discovered on 22 September 1919, by German astronomer Karl Reinmuth at Heidelberg Observatory in southwest Germany. It was named after German ARI astronomer Gert Zech.

Orbit 

Zech is a stony S-type asteroid that orbits the Sun in the inner main-belt at a distance of 1.7–2.8 AU once every 3 years and 5 months (1,236 days). Its orbit has an eccentricity of 0.24 and an inclination of 4° with respect to the ecliptic. The body's observation arc begins with its official discovery observation, as no precoveries were taken, and no prior identifications were made. On 8 June 2002, Zech passed  from the major asteroid 3 Juno.

Diameter 

While "Johnston's Archive" estimates a diameter of 7.61 kilometers for Zech, the Collaborative Asteroid Lightcurve Link assumes a standard albedo for stony asteroids of 0.20 and calculates a diameter of 6.5 kilometers based on an absolute magnitude of 13.3. No observational results have been published by the space-based IRAS, Akari, and WISE/NEOWISE surveys.

Binary system

Primary 

In October 2004, a rotational lightcurve of Zech was obtained from photometric observations by American astronomer Donald P. Pray at Sugarloaf Mountain Observatory, Massachusetts, in a collaboration with other American and European astronomers from France, the Czech Republic, Serbia, Georgia and Ukraine. Lightcurve analysis gave a rotation period of 2.7401 hours with a brightness variation of 0.22 magnitude. While not being a fast rotator, it has a relatively fast spin rate for its size, as most minor planets rotate between 2.2 and 20 hours.

Moon 

During Pray's photometric observations, it was revealed that Zech (primary) is in fact an asynchronous binary asteroid with a minor planet moon orbiting it. The moon has an orbital period of 117.2 hours and a spin rate of 18.718 hours with an amplitude 0.08 magnitude. Based on Pray's secondary-to-primary mean diameter ratio (Ds/p) of more than 0.29, the Johnston's Archive estimates a diameter of at least 2.21 kilometers for Zechs companion.

Naming 

This minor planet was named after German astronomer Gert Zech (born 1941) at ARI in Heidelberg. He was editor of Astronomy and Astrophysics Abstracts and is known for his publications on the observational determination of the length of the astronomical unit and the mass of the Earth–Moon system using the dynamical method by observing the near-Earth object 433 Eros. Naming citation was prepared by Lutz D. Schmadel who also proposed the name. The citation was published on 18 February 1992.

References

External links 
 Determination of the Astronomical Unit by the Dynamical Method, J. Schubart and G. Zech (1967)
The determination of the mass of the earth+moon system by the dynamical method from observations of Eros, G. Zech (1968)
 Donald Pray at Sugarloaf Mountain Observatory, Planetary Society 
 Asteroid Lightcurve Database (LCDB), query form (info )
 Dictionary of Minor Planet Names, Google books
 Asteroids and comets rotation curves, CdR – Observatoire de Genève, Raoul Behrend
 Asteroids with Satellites, Robert Johnston, johnstonsarchive.net
 Discovery Circumstances: Numbered Minor Planets (1)-(5000) – Minor Planet Center
 
 

002623
Discoveries by Karl Wilhelm Reinmuth
Named minor planets
002623
19190922